Britta Holthaus (born 25 January 1979) is a German rower. She competed in the women's eight event at the 2004 Summer Olympics.

References

External links
 

1979 births
Living people
German female rowers
Olympic rowers of Germany
Rowers at the 2004 Summer Olympics
Sportspeople from Essen
World Rowing Championships medalists for Germany